Hans-Joachim Gehrke (born 28 October 1945, Salzgitter-Lebenstedt) is a German archaeologist.

From 1987 until 2008 he was professor of Ancient History at the Albert-Ludwigs-University, Freiburg, having previously taught at the Universities of Göttingen, Würzburg, and the Free University of Berlin. He was President of the German Archaeological Institute from 2008 until 2011.

References 

Living people
Archaeologists from Lower Saxony
1945 births
People from Salzgitter
Academic staff of the University of Freiburg